Cornelius ("Neil") B. Murphy Jr. is Professor of Environmental and Sustainable Systems at the State University of New York College of Environmental Science and Forestry (SUNY-ESF). From 2000 to 2013, he was the third President of SUNY-ESF. Previously, he was president and chief executive officer of O'Brien & Gere, a large environmental engineering consulting firm based in Syracuse, New York. He has a Ph.D. in Chemistry from Syracuse University, and a B.A. in Chemistry from Saint Michael's College.

References

External links 
 Cornelius B. Murphy Jr.'s Huffington Post blog
 Linhorst, Stan. (2014, July 13). "Neil Murphy on Leadership: Don't Shirk the Difficult Things," Syracuse.com.
 Some archives from Cornelius Murphy's tenure as President of SUNY ESF are located in the Archives of the SUNY College of Environmental Sciences and Forestry

State University of New York College of Environmental Science and Forestry faculty
Syracuse University alumni
Living people
HuffPost writers and columnists
Environmental bloggers
Leaders of the State University of New York College of Environmental Science and Forestry
Saint Michael's College alumni
Environmental engineers
American chief executives
Year of birth missing (living people)